Fordow Fuel Enrichment Plant (FFEP) is an Iranian underground uranium enrichment facility located  northeast of the Iranian city of Qom, near Fordow village, at a former Islamic Revolutionary Guard Corps base. The site is under the control of the Atomic Energy Organization of Iran (AEOI). It is the second Iranian uranium enrichment facility, the other one being that of Natanz. According to the Institute for Science and International Security, possible coordinates of the facility's location are: .

Disclosure
Existence of the then-unfinished enrichment plant was disclosed to the International Atomic Energy Agency (IAEA) by Iran on 21 September 2009, but only after the site became known to Western intelligence services. Western officials strongly condemned Iran for not disclosing the site earlier; U.S. President Barack Obama said that Fordow had been under U.S. surveillance. Iran argues that this disclosure was consistent with its legal obligations under its Safeguards Agreement with the IAEA, which Iran claims requires Iran to declare new facilities 180 days before they receive nuclear material. However, the IAEA stated that Iran was bound by its agreement in 2003 to declare the facility as soon as Iran decided to construct it.

Capacity 
In its initial declaration, Iran stated that the purpose of the facility was the production of UF6 enriched up to 5% U-235, and that the facility was being built to contain 16 cascades, with a total of approximately 3000 centrifuges. Later, in September 2011, Iran said it would move its production of 20% LEU to Fordow from Natanz, and enrichment started in December 2011. In January 2012, the IAEA announced that Iran had started producing uranium enriched up to 20% for medical purposes and that material "remains under the agency's containment and surveillance.”

Under the Joint Comprehensive Plan of Action of April 2015, the Fordow plant was to be restructured to less intensive research use. The Fordow facility was to stop enriching uranium and researching uranium enrichment for at least fifteen years, and the facility was to be converted into a nuclear physics and technology centre. For 15 years, it would maintain no more than 1,044 IR-1 centrifuges in six cascades in one wing of Fordow. "Two of those six cascades will spin without uranium and will be transitioned, including through appropriate infrastructure modification," for stable radioisotope production for medical, agricultural, industrial, and scientific use. "The other four cascades with all associated infrastructure will remain idle." Iran is not permitted to have any fissile material in Fordow.

In 2018, Israeli company ImageSat published satellite photographs showing renewed construction and development at the Fordow facility.

On 5 November 2019, Iranian nuclear chief Ali Akbar Salehi announced that Iran will enrich uranium to 5% at Fordow.

History 

Google Maps satellite images for the Fordow site can be found at coordinates 34.885649,50.99669. Images zoomed to the 20 meter level show a large double fence perimeter border erected around the site with towers located every 25 meters.

Iranian authorities state the facility is built deep in a mountain because of repeated threats by Israel to attack such facilities, which Israel believes can be used to produce nuclear weapons. However, attacking a nuclear facility so close to the city of Qom which is considered so holy between Shia Muslims brings concern of a potential risk of a Shiite religious response.

In November 2013, hundreds of Iranians, mostly students of Sharif University of Technology, accompanied by the head of AEOI, Ali Akbar Salehi, and several Majles (parliament) representatives formed a human chain around the Fordow uranium enrichment facility. The students were there to show their support for the Iranian nuclear program.

In 2016, Iran stationed anti-aircraft S-300 missile system at the site.

See also
 Natanz nuclear facility

References

External links
David Albright, Frank Pabian, and Andrea Stricker: The Fordow Enrichment Plant, aka Al Ghadir: Iran’s Nuclear Archive Reveals Site Originally Purposed to Produce Weapon-Grade Uranium for 1–2 Nuclear Weapons per Year – Institute for Science and International Security, March 13, 2019

Nuclear facilities
Industrial buildings in Iran
Uranium
Isotope separation facilities
Buildings and structures in Qom Province
Nuclear program of Iran